American Conspiracies: Lies, Lies, and More Dirty Lies That the Government Tells Us is a book written by former Governor of Minnesota Jesse Ventura, together with Dick Russell. It was published by Skyhorse Publishing in 2010.

Overview
The book presents and discusses conspiracy theories related to several notable events in the history of the United States. Ventura argues that events such as the assassinations of former U.S. Presidents Abraham Lincoln and John F. Kennedy, the assassinations of Martin Luther King Jr., Malcolm X and Robert F. Kennedy, the Watergate scandal, the Jonestown Massacre, the elections of former U.S. President George W. Bush, and the financial crisis of 2007–2010 need to be more thoroughly investigated, and discusses an alleged cover-up of events and information related to the September 11 attacks. Ventura cites physical evidence for some of these claims, and invokes eyewitness testimony as well. Much of the book is based on government documents and stories from the back pages of mainstream American media, such as the New York Times, Newsweek and the Washington Post. The book finds common threads tying together the two Kennedy Assassinations, the Watergate burglary, Iran/Contra and even 9/11. Some of the same actors are implicated in all these events. None of these events led to an investigation by local police, as is required by law. No criminal trials were conducted in any of these cases, that might have led to investigation with subpoena power.

In the book, which is in part based on the TV series Conspiracy Theory with Jesse Ventura, Ventura also claims that a CIA operative worked in Minnesota government during his administration, that he was interviewed by a large group of CIA agents about his successful independent campaign for governor of Minnesota, and that the CIA used double agents that deliberately let themselves get caught at the Watergate complex to bring former U.S. President Richard Nixon down. In the week of March 21, American Conspiracies was listed on place 8 of the Hardcover Nonfiction section of Publishers Weekly, and on place 7 of the section in the following week.

Topics mentioned in the book

Assassination of John F. Kennedy
In the home movie fortuitously recorded by Abraham Zapruder, Kennedy's head jerks backward, indicating that he had been hit from the front. But the warehouse from which Lee Harvey Oswald was supposed to have shot the president was behind Kennedy's back. There was only time for one shot to be fired by Oswald, but there were bullet holes in Kennedy's shoulder as well as his head, and Governor Connally, sitting next to the President, was struck as well. Doctors who performed the original autopsy say that their reports were altered.

Assassination of Robert F. Kennedy
Sirhan Sirhan shot RFK in the stomach at point blank range. Coroners reported that the bullet that killed him was fired into the back of his head. The gun which Sirhan used held 8 bullets that could have been fired in quick succession. Audio recordings of the event can distinguish the sound of at least 9 gunshots, and one thorough analysis claims 13 shots in 5 seconds.

Election Theft
Ventura reveals that a White House computer consultant named Michael Connell was responsible for computerized vote theft in Florida in 2000 and for "disappearing" millions of White House emails that had been subpoenaed by Congress. In 2004, Connell was hired by Ohio Secretary of State J Kenneth Blackwell (who simultaneously co-chaired the Bush re-election campaign in Ohio) to design a computer system for tabulating Ohio county votes that could be accessed from outside. At midnight on Election Night, 2004, the official Secretary of State web site for reporting vote counts in Ohio went black, and when the site came back on-line two hours later, it was no longer housed in Columbus, but (invisibly) at the Chattanooga, TN headquarters of Gov-Tech Solutions, the private White House consultant. This story was slowly revealed during the aftermath of the 2004 election, and Connell was finally subpoenaed for a deposition about his role in computerized vote theft, when he died suddenly in a private plane crash that was declared an accident by Federal authorities, and was never investigated.

9/11
The Twin Towers fell straight down in sudden collapse at speeds so fast that their bottom sections must have started to fall at the same time as the tops. Physicists claim that the buildings could not have fallen in this way because of airplane impact and fires alone, and that they must have been carefully prepared in advance of 9/11. Before 9/11 and since, no steel-framed building has ever collapsed because of a fire, and many have suffered much longer and hotter fires than those in the Twin Towers. People inside the Towers reported the sound of explosions at ground level before the planes struck. Traces of a military-grade explosive, capable of melting steel, were detected in the dust collected in nearby buildings.

There were no identifiable pieces of a Boeing 757 outside the Pentagon where it was struck, and no holes or marks on the wall where wings and heavy engines should have done considerable damage. The flight maneuver that the plane would have had to execute in order to strike the Pentagon where it did was all but impossible, even for an expert pilot, because it required the plane to drop very steeply while executing a 330 degree turn, then level off closer to the ground than the plane is designed to fly. Early reports of the impact said that the Pentagon had been hit by a missile. The Pentagon has surveillance films of the plane (or missile), which it refuses to release. According to official reports, no black boxes were recovered from any of the four hijacked airplanes. But airliner black boxes are designed to survive any conceivable crash, and are almost invariably located because they continue to report their whereabouts with a radio signal.

References

External links
 Amazon.com's book reviews and description 
 Barnes & Noble's editorial reviews and overview 
 OnTheIssues.org's book reviews and excerpts 
 

2010 non-fiction books
American non-fiction books
Books about conspiracy theories
9/11 conspiracy theories
Non-fiction books about the assassination of John F. Kennedy
Works about the Robert F. Kennedy assassination
Jesse Ventura